Ge Fei may refer to:

 Ge Fei (badminton) (born 1975), Olympic badminton player
 Ge Fei (author) (born 1964), author of contemporary Chinese literature